Sten Gustaf Wickbom (14 March 1931 – 26 December 2015) was a Swedish civil servant and member of the Swedish Social Democratic Party. Wickbom served as the minister for justice from 1983 to 1987. He then became the Governor of Kronoberg County from 1988 to 1995.

Early life
Wickbom was born on 14 March 1931 in Stockholm, Sweden, the son of colonel Börje Wickbom and his wife Elsa (née Quiding). He obtained a Candidate of Law degree from Uppsala University in 1954.

Career

Early career
Wickbom did his clerkship from 1955 and 1957 and worked as an extra legal clerk (fiskal) in Svea Court of Appeal in 1958. He then served as court secretary (tingssekreterare) from 1960 to 1962 and assessor in Svea Court of Appeal in 1964. Wickbom became Hovrättsråd in 1969 and worked as an expert in the Ministry of the Interior in 1964, served as deputy director (kansliråd) in the Ministry of Communications in 1967 and as director-general for legal affairs (rättschef) at the Ministry for Civil Service Affairs from 1969 to 1973 and in the Ministry of Housing in 1974. Wickbom served as Director General of the National Swedish Land Survey Administration from 1974 to 1983.

Wickbom also served as chairman, expert, and secretary in a number of government investigations. He was board member of Liber from 1974 to 1977, of the Swedish Central Board for Real Property Data (Centralnämnden för fastighetsdata) from 1981 to 1983 and of the Geological Survey of Sweden from 1982 to 1983.

Minister for Justice and the Berling affair
Wickbom, who served minister for justice from 1983 to 1987, oversaw the investigation into the assassination of Prime Minister Olof Palme, which occurred on 28 February 1986, during his tenure. One year later, Wickbom left the government shortly after the escape of Stig Bergling, a former Swedish Security Service convicted of spying for the Soviet Union. It was rumored that Wickbom was forced to resign following Bergling's escape, which Wickbom denied.

Later work
Wickbom served as Governor of Kronoberg County from 1988 to 1995 and was director general and chairman of the Administrative Policy Commission (Förvaltningspolitiska kommissionen) from 1995 to 1997.

Wickbom was chairman of Dalälvsdelegationen from 1987 to 1994, and of Concerts Sweden (Svenska Rikskonserter) from 1989 to 1996.

Personal life
In 1991, Wickbom married Gunnel Persson (born 1939), the daughter of Axel and Helga Persson.

Wickbom was a native of Växjö. He moved back to Växjö during the 1990s after completing his tenure as Governor of Kronoberg County.

Death
Sten Wickbom died in Växjö on 26 December 2015, at the age of 84. He was survived by his wife, Gunnel Wickbom.

Honours
Members of the Royal Swedish Academy of War Sciences (1982)

References

1931 births
2015 deaths
Swedish Ministers for Justice
Governors of Kronoberg County
Swedish Social Democratic Party politicians
People from Växjö
20th-century Swedish politicians
Uppsala University alumni
Members of the Royal Swedish Academy of War Sciences